Jens Tschiedel (born 5 August 1968, in Wuppertal) is a German professional footballer who played as a defender.

Career
Born in Westphalia, Tschiedel began playing football in the Bayer Leverkusen reserves. He played in the 2. Bundesliga with FC Gütersloh and 1. FC Union Berlin, after helping Union Berlin gain promotion from the Regionalliga Nord.

Honours
 DFB-Pokal finalist: 2001.

References

1968 births
Living people
German footballers
Association football defenders
Bayer 04 Leverkusen II players
Alemannia Aachen players
Rot Weiss Ahlen players
1. FC Union Berlin players
FC Gütersloh 2000 players
Wuppertaler SV players
2. Bundesliga players
Regionalliga players
Sportspeople from Wuppertal
Footballers from North Rhine-Westphalia
West German footballers